Eucalyptus langleyi, commonly known as the green mallee ash or albatross mallee, is a species of mallee that is endemic to a small area of New South Wales. It has mostly smooth grey to yellowish bark, lance-shaped to curved adult leaves, flower buds in groups of seven, white flowers and cup-shaped to barrel-shaped fruit.

Description
It has smooth, grey, green or pink bark that is shed in ribbons. Flowering has been recorded in May, September and November and the flowers are white.

Taxonomy and naming
Eucalyptus langleyi was first formally described in 1991 by Lawrie Johnson and Donald Blaxell from a specimen collected by Blaxell and Douglas Howard Benson near Yalwal Road, Nowra in 1974, and the description was published in the journal Telopea. The specific epithet (langleyi) honours "Lawrence Langley of Robertson" who drew the authors' attention to the species.

Distribution and habitat
The green mallee ash grows in mallee shrubland in shallow, sandy soil over sandstone. It is only known from two stands south-west of Nowra.

Conservation status
This mallee is listed as "vulnerable" under the Australian Government Environment Protection and Biodiversity Conservation Act 1999 and the New South Wales Government Biodiversity Conservation Act 2016. The population occurring north of the Shoalhaven River contained 32 plants in 1998, but a survey ten years later found only 20 of them still alive. This population is listed as "critically endangered" under the New South Wales Act. The main threats to the species are residential and recreational development and by road, trail and pipeline maintenance. In 2000, three clumps of trees were destroyed during gas pipe line constructions and others were covered in debris.

References

Further reading
 Brooker, M. and Kleinig, D.A. (1999) Field guide to eucalypts, Volume 1: South-eastern Australia. 2nd edn. Blooming Books, Hawthorn.
 Harden, G.J. (ed.) (2002) Flora of New South Wales Volume 2 Revised Edition. UNSW, Sydney.
 Atlas of Living Australia.

langleyi
Flora of New South Wales
Plants described in 1991
Taxa named by Lawrence Alexander Sidney Johnson